Sir Joseph Cooke Verco (1 August 1851 – 26 July 1933) was an Australian physician and conchologist.

Early years
Verco, born at Fullarton, South Australia, was a son of James Crabb Verco. Both his parents came from Cornwall, UK. He was educated at the J. L. Young's Adelaide Educational Institution, and after spending a year in the South Australian Railways, intending to become a civil engineer, he decided to take up medicine. As he wished to matriculate at the University of London, he found it necessary to do more work in classics and spent a year at St Peter's College, Adelaide for this purpose. At that school he won the Young exhibition, awarded to the best scholar of the year, and then went to London at the beginning of 1870. He obtained his M.R.C.S. in 1874; M.B. in 1875, with scholarship and the gold medals for forensic medicine and medicine; L.R.C.P. in 1875; B.S., with scholarship and gold medal; M.D.; and F.R.C.S. – all in London in 1876. Verco was one of the most brilliant students of his time and a successful career in London was open to him.

Medical career
Verco was appointed house physician at St Bartholomew's Hospital in 1876, and midwifery assistant in 1877. In 1878 he returned to Adelaide.  After a few years of general practice at Adelaide, Verco became recognized as its leading physician, and led a very busy life. From 1882 to 1912 he was honorary physician to the Adelaide hospital, and then honorary consulting physician. In 1898, Samuel Barbour sold his X-ray apparatus for £120 to Verco. He was for several years honorary physician to the Adelaide Children's hospital. He was lecturer in medicine at the University of Adelaide from 1887 to 1915, President of the Adelaide Medical Students' Society in 1904 and 1906–1915, Dean of the Faculty of Medicine 1919-21, and subsequently Dean of the Faculty of Dentistry. He was a member of the council of the University from 1895 to 1902 and 1919 to 1933. He was president of the South Australian branch of the British Medical Association in 1886-7 and 1914-19. For some years before his retirement from practice in 1919, he specialized in consultative work as a physician. He did not do much writing on medical subjects, but with E. C. Stirling wrote the article on hydatid disease in Allbutt's System of Medicine. "This not only collated the early literature, but was illuminated by the authors' personal experience of cases and at the time was recognized as a classic presentation of the subject".

Scientific interests
Verco's interest in science was not confined to its medical side. He was elected a fellow of the Adelaide Philosophical Society, (subsequently the Royal Society of South Australia) in 1878. From a lad he had been interested in shells and he began his serious study of this subject in 1887. He did a large amount of dredging in the Great Australian Bight of much value to marine biology. He collaborated with Charles Hedley and Professor William A. Haswell in investigating South Australia's continental shelf. His work as a taxonomist included the description of Sepia braggi, the slender cuttlefish. His own collection of shells became a very fine one, and he had an excellent and valuable library of literature on the subject. This collection, including the books, was eventually presented to the South Australian Museum, where Verco spent much time after his retirement as honorary conchologist. He was mentor to Bernard Charles Cotton, who served as the museum's Curator of Molluscs from 1934 to 1962.

His general interest in the Royal Society was very great and he was an admirable president. First elected to that office in 1903, he was re-elected year by year, until 1921 when he declined further nomination. As vice-president or member of the council, his connexion was maintained until his death. He started its research and endowment fund with the sum of £1,000 in 1908, and on several other occasions gave financial aid when it was required.

Verco was knighted in 1919.

The database WoRMS contains 150 marine species named by J.C. Verco, many of which have become synonyms.

Legacy
The Verco Medal is the highest award granted by the Royal Society of South Australia.
The Verco Building at Minda Home (built in 1914) is named for him.

References
 Southcott, R. V., 'Verco, Sir Joseph Cooke (1851–1933)', ''Australian Dictionary of Biography, Volume 12, (MUP), 1990

1851 births
1933 deaths
Australian general practitioners
Australian people of Cornish descent
People educated at Adelaide Educational Institution
People educated at St Peter's College, Adelaide
Australian Knights Bachelor
Conchologists
Australian malacologists